Marcel Depont (born 28 March 1901, date of death unknown) was a French boxer. He competed in the 1924 Summer Olympics. In 1924, Depont was eliminated in the quarter-finals of the featherweight class after losing his fight to the upcoming bronze medalist Pedro Quartucci.

References

External links
profile

1901 births
Year of death missing
Featherweight boxers
Olympic boxers of France
Boxers at the 1924 Summer Olympics
French male boxers